A vassal or liege subject is a person regarded as having a mutual obligation to a lord or monarch, in the context of the feudal system in medieval Europe. While the subordinate party is called a vassal, the dominant party is called a suzerain. The rights and obligations of a vassal are called vassalage, while the rights and obligations of a suzerain are called suzerainty.
The obligations of a vassal often included military support by knights in exchange for certain privileges, usually including land held as a tenant or fief. The term is also applied to similar arrangements in other feudal societies.

In contrast, fealty (fidelitas) was sworn, unconditional loyalty to a monarch.

European vassalage 
In fully developed vassalage, the lord and the vassal would take part in a commendation ceremony composed of two parts, the homage and the fealty, including the use of Christian sacraments to show its sacred importance. According to Eginhard's brief description, the commendatio made to Pippin the Younger in 757 by Tassilo III, Duke of Bavaria, involved the relics of Saints Denis, Rusticus, Éleuthère,  Martin, and  Germain – apparently assembled at Compiegne for the event. Such refinements were not included from the outset when it was time of crisis, war, hunger, etc. Under feudalism, those who were weakest needed the protection of the knights who owned the weapons and knew how to fight.

Feudal society was increasingly based on the concept of "lordship" (French seigneur), which was one of the distinguishing features of the Early Middle Ages and had evolved from times of Late Antiquity.

In the time of Charlemagne (ruled 768–814), the connection slowly developed between vassalage and the grant of land, the main form of wealth at that time. Contemporaneous social developments included agricultural "manorialism" and the social and legal structures labelled — but only since the 18th century — "feudalism". These developments proceeded at different rates in various regions. In Merovingian times (5th century to 752), monarchs would reward only the greatest and most trusted vassals with lands. Even at the most extreme devolution of any remnants of central power, in 10th-century France, the majority of vassals still had no fixed estates.

The stratification of a fighting band of vassals into distinct groups might roughly correlate with the new term "fief" that had started to supersede "benefice" in the 9th century. An "upper" group comprised great territorial magnates, who were strong enough to ensure the inheritance of their benefice to the heirs of their family. A "lower" group consisted of landless knights attached to a count or duke. This social settling process also received impetus in fundamental changes in the conduct of warfare. As co-ordinated cavalry superseded disorganized infantry, armies became more expensive to maintain. A vassal needed economic resources to equip the cavalry he was bound to contribute to his lord to fight his frequent wars. Such resources, in the absence of a money economy, came only from land and its associated assets, which included peasants as well as wood and water.

Difference between "vassal" and "vassal state"

Many empires have set up vassal states, based on tribes, kingdoms, or city-states, the subjects of which they wish to control without having to conquer or directly govern them. In these cases a subordinate state (such as a dependency, residency, client state or protectorate) has retained internal autonomy, but has lost independence in foreign policy, while also, in many instances, paying formal tribute, or providing troops when requested.
This is a similar relationship to vassals, but vassals hold fiefdoms which are present in the actual territory of the monarch.

In this framework, a "formal colony" or "junior ally" might also be regarded as a vassal state in terms of international relations, analogous to a domestic "fief-holder" or "trustee".

The concept of a vassal state uses the concept of personal vassalry to theorize formally hegemonic relationships between states – even those using non-personal forms of rule. Imperial states to which this terminology has been applied include, for instance: Ancient Rome, the Mongol Empire, Imperial China and the British Empire.

See also
 Feudalism in the Holy Roman Empire
 Freeborn
 Lehnsmann
 Mandala (political model)
 Suzerainty
 Thegn
 Vavasour, a type of vassal
 Zamindar

Similar terms
 Gokenin, vassals of the shogunate in Japan
 Manrent, Scottish Clan treaties of offensive and defensive alliance
 Nöken (plural: nöker) was the Mongol term for a tribal leader acknowledging another as his liege
 Villein, a serf, or low-born worker under feudalism

Notes

References 
Citations

Sources

 Cantor, Norman, The Civilization of the Middle Ages 1993.
 Rouche, Michel, "Private life conquers state and society," in A History of Private Life vol I, Paul Veyne, editor, Harvard University Press 1987 .

External links 
 

Feudalism
Medieval titles
History of work